Henry de Somerset was Dean of Exeter between 1302 and 1307.

Notes

Deans of Exeter